"Boa Me" is a single by English-Ghanaian recording artist Fuse ODG, featuring vocals from Ed Sheeran and Mugeez. The song was released in the United Kingdom as a digital download on 10 November 2017. The song peaked at number 52 on the UK Singles Chart.

Background
Ed Sheeran flew to Ghana to work with Fuse ODG and they wrote songs together, including "Boa Me". The song sees Sheeran singing in Twi, a Ghanaian language. In an interview with the Daily Star, Fuse ODG said, "This one Ed didn’t speak a word of English in the song, just Twi and would only do it if he got it right. I showed all sorts of different types of music out there, he wanted to make a real authentic High Life track – that's the old-skool Afrobeats music my parents would play. Ed is becoming a High Life legend because when I played it to people in Ghana they didn’t even realise it was Ed, that’s how much he sounded like the real thing. We did a test where people came to the house and the reaction was: 'This is crazy'." The song was recorded at the same time as "Bibia Be Ye Ye" which features on Ed's album Divide and the music is helping local communities in Africa. Fuse said: "The word literally means 'help me' and the concept of the track is help your neighbour. We took him to a school we were building and straight away he understood the impact we can make, and donated a school bus. The funds go towards setting up the secondary school and fixing the bridge that connects the village to the school so kids can go safely."

Music video
The music video for "Boa Me" premiered on 16 November 2017.

Features
Michael Dapaah (a.k.a. Big Shaq) made a remix of Boa Me called Boa Me Remix and was released in March 2018.

Track listing

Charts

Release history

References

2017 singles
2017 songs
Fuse ODG songs
Ed Sheeran songs
Songs written by Ed Sheeran